Leucocarcelia is a genus of parasitic flies in the family Tachinidae.<

Species
Leucocarcelia argyrata Villeneuve, 1921

Distribution
Malawi

References

Exoristinae
Diptera of Africa
Monotypic Brachycera genera
Insects of Malawi
Tachinidae genera